Ayi Kush was a king of the Ga dangme. He is the first known Gã Mantse of recorded History.

The Great Nicolai Ashaley , the leader of the great migration was both a spiritual and political leader of the Gã people, and he led the Gãs to their homelands, and unified the various Gã state through the giving of "His Seven Commandment".

See also 
 Ga Dangme people
 Gã Mantse

References 

Ghanaian leaders
People from Accra
Ghanaian royalty